"Maybe That's All It Takes" is a song recorded by American country music artist Don Williams.  It was released in June 1990 as the fourth single from the album One Good Well.  The song reached #22 on the Billboard Hot Country Singles & Tracks chart.  The song was written by Beth Nielsen Chapman.

Chart performance

References

1990 singles
1989 songs
Don Williams songs
Songs written by Beth Nielsen Chapman
Song recordings produced by Garth Fundis